Philip Jonathan Perry (born October 16, 1964) is an American attorney and was a political appointee in the administration of George W. Bush. He was acting associate attorney general at the Department of Justice, general counsel of the Office of Management and Budget, and general counsel of the Department of Homeland Security. He is a partner at Latham & Watkins in Washington, D.C. He has handled matters before the U.S. Supreme Court, the U.S. Courts of Appeals, and U.S. District Courts across the country. He is known both for his pioneering work litigating biotechnology issues and his work on constitutional and federal regulatory matters. Perry was named a "Litigation Trailblazer" by The National Law Journal in 2018 for his "remarkable successes" in litigation, and has seen continued success in 2019, winning cases in both federal appellate and trial courts. He is the husband of Congresswoman Liz Cheney and the son-in-law of former Vice President Dick Cheney.

Early life and education 
Perry was born in San Diego County, California. He graduated with a Bachelor of Arts degree in English from Colorado College in 1986. He earned a Juris Doctor degree from Cornell Law School in 1990.

Career

Counsel to United States Senate/campaign finance abuse 
In 1997–98, Perry was counsel to the United States Senate hearings on campaign finance abuses in the 1996 presidential campaigns.

2000 presidential transition team 
In 2000, he was a policy advisor for the Bush-Cheney presidential transition team and an advisor on the Vice Presidential Debate preparation team. Of Perry, Cheney said, "He was tough...much tougher than I would have been on my father-in-law."

Department of Justice 
Perry joined the Department of Justice and served in a number of roles before being named acting associate attorney general (the Department’s third-ranking official), overseeing DOJ's five civil litigating units: Civil, Tax, Environment and Natural Resources, Antitrust, and Civil Rights.

Office of Management and Budget 
In 2002, Perry then moved to the White House to be general counsel for the Office of Management and Budget (OMB) under the then-Director Governor Mitch Daniels. In that capacity, Perry supervised the White House's clearance of federal regulations, mediated interagency disputes, addressed matters on the DOJ's civil litigation docket, formulated presidential executive orders, developed White House policy initiatives, and advised the president. Among his tasks as general counsel was drafting the legislation that created the new Department of Homeland Security. Kenneth Feinberg, special master of the September 11th Victim Compensation Fund called Perry "a first-rate lawyer," "quiet but determined, " and the "unsung hero" of the team of lawyers faced with settling the issue of which family members of September 11 victims would be eligible to receive compensation. Perry suggested that in cases where family wills did not stipulate beneficiaries (80%), the matter should be determined under the inheritance laws of the state in which a victim held residence.

Latham & Watkins 
After multiple years of federal service, Perry returned to Latham & Watkins as a partner, where he rejoined their litigation and regulatory groups, serving as counsel on behalf of Fortune 500 clients such as Monsanto, defense contractor Lockheed Martin and others. The Washington Post reported that at Latham & Watkins, Perry was "a leader of its homeland security practice."

Perry's law practice has largely involved federal court litigation.  He has served as lead trial counsel in important nationally prominent matters.  Although he has handled numerous commercial matters, his most high-profile successes have involved federal constitutional issues, government regulation and federal contracts.   For example, Perry recently successfully handled the Roundup Ready alfalfa case in federal district court in San Francisco.  Other recent high-profile matters include:
 Monsanto Co. v. Geertson Seed Farms, 130 S. Ct. 2743 (2010);
 Entergy Corp. v. Riverkeeper, Inc., 129 S. Ct. 1498 (2009);
 Ctr. for Food Safety v. Vilsack, 636 F.3d 1166 (9th Cir. 2011);
 Sottera, Inc. v. FDA, 627 F.3d 891 (D.C. Cir. 2010);
 Ctr. for Food Safety v. Vilsack, No. 10-4038, 2011 US Dist. LEXIS 31688 (N.D. Cal. Mar. 17, 2011);
 Wyeth Pharmaceuticals v. FDA, No. 1:09-cv-01810-FJS, slip op. (D.D.C. Sept. 24, 2009);
 Sottera, Inc. v. FDA, 680 F. Supp. 2d 62 (D.D.C. 2010).
See

General counsel for Department of Homeland Security 
In April 2005, President George Bush nominated  Perry to be the general counsel for the Department of Homeland Security.  Perry was confirmed unanimously by the U.S. Senate later that year.  In his position as the general counsel for the DHS, Perry supervised over 1,500 lawyers, and advised Secretary Michael Chertoff and the White House on the Department's legal and policy issues. Issues of influence for Perry included, but were not limited to, "the transit of people and cargo, comprehensive immigration reform, and critical infrastructure such as chemical plants." A Cornell Law alumni newsletter reports, "While at DHS, he was joined by Gus P. Coldebella '94, current acting general counsel, and Julie L. Myers '94, assistant secretary of homeland security for U.S. Immigration and Customs Enforcement."

Return to private sector 
Perry was also "closely involved" in the inter-agency Committee on Foreign Investment in the United States (CFIUS) National Security Agreement process.

Awards and honors 
Perry has been recognized as a leading litigator in the Euromoney Institutional Investor Benchmark: Litigation 2008 guide.

Personal life 
Perry is married to Elizabeth Cheney, an alumna of Colorado College. They have five children. Elizabeth Cheney is the daughter of former Vice President Dick Cheney. She is the former deputy assistant secretary of state for near eastern affairs at the State Department, and was a member of the Iran Syria Policy and Operations Group, and was elected to the U.S. House of Representatives from Wyoming's at-large congressional district.

Quotes 
 "The term 'revolving door' implies people going in and out of government in order to obtain monetary gain. The reason people go into government is to serve their country. It's not appropriate to describe that as a 'revolving door,' unless of course you make a lot of money doing it."

References

External links
 

1964 births
Living people
California Republicans
Cheney family
Colorado College alumni
Cornell Law School alumni
George W. Bush administration personnel
Lawyers from Washington, D.C.
People from San Diego
People from Wilson, Wyoming
United States Department of Homeland Security officials
United States Department of Justice lawyers
Wyoming lawyers
Wyoming Republicans